Helichrysum monogynum, also known as red tinderbox, is a species of flowering plant within the family Asteraceae.

Description 
Helichrysum monogynum is a hermaphrodite species, which possesses a low rate of seed germination.

Distribution and habitat 
Helichrysum monogynum is endemic to the Canary Islands, Spain, where it can only be found on the northeast side of the island of Lanzarote. It can be found growing at altitudes ranging from 40 - 575 metres above sea level. There are currently only three populations known in three different locations: la Florida, Las Nieves and Montaña Cavera.

Helichrysum monogynum can be found growing on volcanic rock and sandy habitats near to the coast. It can also be found growing in nitrogen rich soils such as in locations of abandoned crop fields and on the verges of paths and roads. It is a species that is associated with shrubland, rocky areas, cliffs and mountain peaks.

Ecology 
Helichrysum monogynum is often associated with xerophytic communities where it can be found alongside plant species such as: Launaea arborescens, Helianthemum canariense, Kleinia neriifolia, Euphorbia regis-juba, Caroxylon vermiculatum.

References 

monogynum
Endemic flora of Spain
Flora of Spain
Endangered plants